Ranjit Vasantrao More (born on 4 November 1959) is an Indian Judge. He is former Chief Justice of Meghalaya High Court. He is also former Judge of Meghalaya High Court and Bombay High Court.

References 

 

Indian judges
1959 births
Living people